Diblemma  may refer to:
 Diblemma (plant), a fern genus in the sub family Microsoroideae
 Diblemma (spider), a spider genus in the family Oonopidae